Mørkenatten Peak is a peak,  high, located  south of Chervov Peak in the Shcherbakov Range of the Orvin Mountains, in Queen Maud Land, Antarctica. It was mapped by Norway from air photos and surveys by the Sixth Norwegian Antarctic Expedition 1956–60, and named "Mørkenatten" (the dark night).

References

Mountains of Queen Maud Land
Princess Astrid Coast